.
 was the forty-ninth of the sixty-nine stations of the Nakasendō connecting Edo with Kyoto in Edo period Japan. It is located in former Mino Province in what is now part of the town of  Mitake, Kani District, Gifu Prefecture, Japan. Travelers often came straight to Mitake-juku to avoid the difficult paths near Hosokute-juku.

History
The temple of  Gankō-ji (願興寺) was founded by Saichō, the founder of Tendai Buddhism in Japan in 815 AD, and Mitake-juku grew as a temple town in front of the gates of this temple. It was thus a station on the ancient Tōsandō highway long before the creation of the Nakasendō. The area was devastated by floods in 995 AD, but the temple and settlement were spared - a fact commemorated in a festival to this date. The temple was repeatedly destroyed by natural disasters and by wars, the last of which was during fighting between Takeda Shingen and Oda Nobunaga in 1572. Many of the structures of the temple date to the late Sengoku period or early Edo period. When the system of post stations on the Nakasendō was formalized by the Tokugawa shogunate in 1602, and Mitaka-juku became a stopping place for traveling merchants and for various western daimyō  on the sankin-kōtai to-and-from the Shogun's court in Edo.  Sekigahara is 443 kilometers from Edo.

Mitake-juku is 376.4 kilometers from Edo.

Modern Mitake-juku is fairly well-preserved. The honjin (built in 1742) and several machiya, including the Tateya hatago (built in 1877) still survives, as does the teahouse which was the subject of Hirsohige's print.

Mitake-juku in The Sixty-nine Stations of the Kiso Kaidō
Utagawa Hiroshige's ukiyo-e print of Mitake-juku dates from 1835 -1838. The print depicts travelers preparing to depart the station in the early morning. A notice on the front of the open-fronted teahouse proclaims "kichinyago", which was a restaurant with cheap lodgings. Inside are four travelers around a large cauldron, one of whom is talking with the mistress of the house, and on the porch is a man tying on his sandals. Outside, a woman, possibly a vendor, has two buckets suspended from a pole on her shoulder, while an old woman nearby is rubbing out a bucket by a stream. In the distance, a heavily laden man struggles up the hill, and Mount Ontake can be seen as a shadow in the far distance.

Neighboring Post Towns
Nakasendō
Hosokute-juku - Mitake-juku - Fushimi-juku

References

External links

Hiroshige Kiso-Kaido series
Mitake-juku on Kiso Kaido Road
Gifu Nakasendo Guide

Notes

Stations of the Nakasendō
Post stations in Gifu Prefecture
Mitake, Gifu
Mino Province